The Johns Hopkins News-Letter is the independent student newspaper of the Johns Hopkins University in Baltimore, Maryland, U.S. Published since 1896, it is one of the nation's oldest continuously published, weekly, student-run college newspapers.

Before the COVID-19 pandemic, The News-Letter was published every Thursday in a full-color front and back page broadsheet format, and has two sections: an A section and a B section. Its total circulation was approximately 5,200, including the local campuses of Johns Hopkins, area colleges, and the greater Baltimore region. However, the newspaper's print publication has been paused due to the pandemic, but the paper continues to publish daily on its website.

Several times a year, The News-Letter distributes a magazine edition with 20- to 30-page tabloid-sized inserts, such as Best of Baltimore, Cover-Letter (introducing new students to the University), Housing Guide, Lacrosse Guide, and the Dining Guide.

The editorial and business boards consist entirely of undergraduates. Members of the editorial staff are democratically elected to one-year terms, while members of the business board are hired by the editors-in-chief. The current editors-in-chief are Molly Gahagen and Michelle Limpe.

The News-Letter won an Associated Collegiate Press Newspaper Pacemaker award for four-year, non-daily college newspapers in 2015, 2013, 2008, 2005, 2003, and 1995 and was a finalist for the award in 2010, 2007, and 1997.

In 2020, The News-Letter was one of ten student media organizations to receive funding from the Poynter Institute for a reporting project to advance civil discourse on campus. As a culmination of its efforts, The News-Letter published "Examining Hopkins Hospital’s Relationship with Baltimore", a magazine that explores the University's historic role within the city of Baltimore.

The News-Letter is an affiliate of UWIRE, which distributes and promotes its content to their network.

History 
During the founding years of the university, the board of trustees of Johns Hopkins University prohibited the creation of any student publication without the board's written permission. In 1889 specifically, when talks of a News-Letter originated, several board members had their hesitations. Seven years later however, James M. Thomson 1897 and Edgeworth Smith 1898 petitioned the Academic Council to allow publication of four trial issues of a fortnightly periodical to be called The Johns Hopkins News-Letter. Its aim, at a pricey 15 cents an issue, would be to report on local events and provide a forum for students who wished to publish opinion pieces. Eventually, and reluctantly, the board acquiesced, "provided that the plan be carried out in a manner satisfactory to the President."

In October, 1967, The News-Letter moved its offices to the Gatehouse, a small neo-Italianate building located on the corner of North Charles Street and Art Museum Drive, next to the Baltimore Museum of Art. The building was originally called the Homewood lodge and marked the entrance to William Wyman's Homewood estate.

The period 1997 - 2001 was characterized by a heightened sense of playfulness, punctuated by aggressive, but thoughtful, criticism.
Often referred to as the "Gutting and Langbein era," the period saw a doubling of revenues for the newspaper, which is often attributed to the emergence of noted author Steve Cocker and his sharp eye for the
more colorful details in life.

Sometimes criticized for its seeming immaturity, the News-Letter's simpleton charms veiled a juggernaut of influence operating below the surface. The reassignment of administrators Ralph Johnson and Mike Little are frequently attributed to the paper, as are the tearful pleas of student representative Greg Wu on the Gilman Quad in late 2001 and the lack of attendance at the 2000 Shaggy concert.

Never dull, News-Letter editors during the period were known to be called before disciplinary boards from time to time, as well as scream profanities, while intoxicated, at administrators. These editorial boards withstood the reactionary administrative backlash by hiding behind a number of technicalities, making friends with other administrators, and trading student-politics favors. Like corporate boards of the times, News-Letter editors held positions of power in many other student organizations around campus, providing the paper with political leverage and access it had never had before and never would again.

Unfortunately, after the 2000/2001 academic year, the paper soon began its inevitable decline as the News-Letter's healthy disregard for authority began to fade into the past. By 2005, the News-Letter could count itself among a number of student groups funded through the University and overseen by the ethically questionable administrator Bill Smedick.

The News-Letter added a public editor position in 2019. Currently, The News-Letter has seven sections: News & Features, Opinions, Sports, Science & Technology, Voices, Arts & Entertainment, and Your Weekend.

Controversy 
The News-Letter retracted its coverage of a webinar by Genevieve Briand, the assistant program director of the Applied Economics master’s degree program at Hopkins. Briand argued that there was "no evidence that COVID-19 created any excess deaths." A statement on November 26, 2020 published on social media noted that the article was "used to support false and dangerous inaccuracies about the impact of the pandemic." A day later, The News-Letter published an explanation of the retraction and made the original article viewable as a PDF.

Notable News-Letter alumni 
Russell Baker, Pulitzer Prize-winning columnist and former host of Masterpiece Theatre
J.D. Considine, music critic and former Rolling Stone writer
Richard Ben Cramer, winner of the Pulitzer Prize for International Reporting in 1979 for reports from the Middle East, New York Times best-selling author
Lauren (Spencer) Deford, Senior Coordinating Producer at SportsNet New York (SNY) and NBC Universal
Caleb Deschanel, cinematographer and father of Zooey Deschanel and Emily Deschanel
Bruce Drake, former vice president of National Public Radio
Galen Druke, host and producer of FiveThirtyEight podcast
Mark Hertsgaard, independent journalist and environmental correspondent for The Nation
Alger Hiss, U.S. State Department official accused of being a Soviet spy
Murray Kempton, noted American journalist
Sujata Massey, mystery writer
Edward L. Morse, Global Head of Commodities Research at Citigroup
Irvin B. Nathan, former Attorney General of the District of Columbia and General Counsel of the United States House of Representatives
Sidney Offit, curator of the George Polk Award
Felix Posen, philanthropist and promoter of Humanistic Judaism
Russ Smith, founder of the Baltimore City Paper and New York Press
Helmut Sonnenfeldt, chairman of the Atlantic Council of the United States and a former aide to Henry Kissinger
James M. Thomson, publisher of the New Orleans States-Item, later to become the present-day Times-Picayune
James Rosen, Washington D.C. correspondent for Fox News

References

External links
The online edition of The Johns Hopkins News-Letter, http://www.jhunewsletter.com

News-letter
Student newspapers published in Maryland
Newspapers published in Baltimore